Sama de Grado is one of 28 parishes (administrative divisions) in the municipality of Grado, within the province and autonomous community of Asturias, in northern Spain.

The population is 164 (INE 2007).

Villages and hamlets
La Corredoria
Doró (Doróu)
La Mata
Palacio (Palaciu)
Pedredo (Pedréu)
Trasmuria (Tresmuria)
La Vega (La Veiga)

References

Parishes in Grado